On 8 September 1997 Flight 451, a Eurocopter AS 332L1 Super Puma, from the Norwegian helicopter operator Helikopter Service, crashed into the Norwegian Sea,  northwest of Brønnøysund, Norway. The aircraft was en route from Brønnøysund Airport, Brønnøy to Norne, an offshore Floating production storage and offloading vessel (FPSO). The accident was caused by a fatigue crack in a spline of a power transmission shaft connector, which ultimately caused the power transmission shaft to fail. All twelve people on board were killed in the crash.

Aircraft
The accident aircraft was an AS332 L1 Super Puma helicopter, manufactured by Eurocopter (now named Airbus Helicopters), registration LN-OPG.

Background 
At 06:00 a.m. local time (UTC+2), Helikopter Service Flight 451 took off from Brønnøysund Airport with two pilots and ten passengers, heading for the Statoil operated FPSO Norne. The route was a daily shuttle due to lack of accommodation on Norne during the busy period when the vessel was under commissioning.

Accident
The flight proceeded as normal until 06:50:07 hours when the engine overspeed light was observed for a short time. The co-pilot read out the corresponding information from the emergency checklist, before they continued the approach to land on Norne. At 06:52:41 hours the crew contacted Transocean Prospect, the oil platform that was handling radio communication with helicopters landing on Norne. At 06:54:42 hours they informed Bodø ATCC that they were leaving , with an estimated time of arrival of 07:05 hours. According to the helicopter's cockpit voice recorder (CVR), the abnormal indications recurred at 06:55:37 hours before "something strange" was observed at 06:55:55 hours. A thud was heard at 06:56:30 hours; then, after a loud crunching sound 1.7 seconds later, the crew lost control over the aircraft.

All twelve people on board were killed in the crash.

Summary of investigation findings 
Following their investigation of the accident, the Norwegian Accident Investigation Board (AIBN) concluded that the cause of the accident was multiple fatigue cracks in the splined sleeve between the high-speed bendix shaft and the right-hand engine, which had caused damage to the engine overspeed protection system. The splined sleeve disintegrated, severing the high-speed shaft, which led to an overspeed of the right-hand power turbine which in turn burst, destroying the left-hand engine as well as to cutting control rods which made the helicopter uncontrollable.

The crew could not be expected to have been sufficiently knowledgeable about the aircraft's control system to understand the seriousness of the intermittent overspeed alarm, and there were no procedures or checklists available that covered this scenario.

The AIBN also found reason to believe that one of the HUMS accelerometers installed in the aircraft would have been able to alert maintenance crew about the change in vibration patterns in time to avoid the accident had it been serviceable since it was configured with a setpoint value. Retrospective analysis of HUMS data showed that vibrations at the location where this accelerometer was mounted were above the setpoint value before the accident. The part of HUMS that was serviceable stored relevant information, but those data had to be retrieved by maintenance staff and analyzed between flights. At the time of the accident, usage of HUMS in offshore helicopters was in an early phase and not required by regulations. The cracks had been developing slowly for several days before the catastrophic failure occurred, and if HUMS data had been systematically retrieved and analyzed between flights the change in vibration patterns might have been discovered by maintenance staff before the fatal flight. Regulation of HUMS in offshore helicopters was one of 18 recommendations in the final AIBN report. The AIBN report and the unrealized potential of HUMS in avoiding this accident was discussed at the 2003 HUMS Conference in Melbourne and was described as "a defining moment" for HUMS in offshore helicopter operations.

See also
Other North Sea helicopter incidents:
 1986 British International Helicopters Chinook crash
 Bristow Helicopters Flight 56C (1995)
 Bond Offshore Helicopters Flight 85N (2009)
 CHC Helikopter Service Flight 241 (2016)

References

Aviation accidents and incidents in Norway
CHC Helikopter Service accidents and incidents
Accidents and incidents involving the Eurocopter AS332 Super Puma
Aviation accidents and incidents in 1997
1997 in Norway
Brønnøy
Norwegian Sea
Airliner accidents and incidents caused by in-flight structural failure
September 1997 events in Europe